The Green Park Stadium—formerly known as Modi Stadium—is a cricket ground in Kanpur, India. It is the home ground of the Uttar Pradesh cricket team and has played host to Ranji Trophy matches, as well as being a Test and One Day International (ODI) venue. The ground has hosted 21 Test matches, since the first one in 1952 when India played England. It has also staged 14 ODIs, the first of which was in 1986 when India lost to Sri Lanka by a margin of 17 runs. As of February 2016, no T20 International has been played at the ground.

The first century at the ground was scored by the West Indian Garfield Sobers. He made 198 during the second Test of the 1958–59 West Indies tour of India. The first Indian to score a century at the ground was Polly Umrigar, who made 147 not out against England in December 1961. West Indian Faoud Bacchus' 250, against India in February 1979, is the highest individual score by a batsman at the ground. India's Gundappa Viswanath and Mohammed Azharuddin have scored the most centuries at the venue with three each. The latter also holds the record for the highest score by an Indian at the ground. As of February 2016, 32 Test centuries have been scored at the stadium.

India's Chetan Sharma was the first player to score an ODI century at the ground. He made 101 not out against England during the Nehru Cup (1989). Shahid Afridi's 45-ball century against India in April 2005 at the venue is the fastest century scored in India. As of March 2016, Rohit Sharma's 150 against South Africa is the highest ODI score by a batsman at the ground. The record for the highest score in the format by an overseas player belongs to the Pakistani Salman Butt, who made 129 against India in November 2007. As of February 2016, nine ODI centuries have been scored by as many players at the Green Park Stadium.

Key
 Score denotes the number of runs scored by the batsman in an innings.
 * denotes that the batsman was not out.
 Inns. denotes the number of the innings in the match.
 Balls denotes the number of balls faced by the batsman in an innings.
 NR denotes that the statistic was not recorded.
 Date denotes the date in which the match started.
 Result denotes the result of the player's team.
 Drawn denotes that the match was drawn.

Test cricket

One Day Internationals

References

Cricket grounds in Uttar Pradesh
Green Park Stadium
Centuries